The Atim Kâ-mihkosit Reserve ( atim kâ-mihkosit, literal meaning Horse that is red) is an Indian reserve of the Star Blanket Cree Nation in Saskatchewan. An urban reserve, it is located in the city of Regina, where it encompasses the First Nations University of Canada.

References

Urban Indian reserves in Canada
Indian reserves in Saskatchewan
Division No. 6, Saskatchewan
Star Blanket Cree Nation